This is a list of Military Veterinary Services from around the world. Some are still active while others were disbanded, mostly around the decline of horses in military service.

In general, Military Veterinary Services provide care for service animals, public health services (food inspection, water quality), development assistance and research services. However each service varies significantly from others based on national mandates and interests.

References

Veterinary
Military veterinary services